Maurice Gilbert Perrot des Gozis (12 November 1851 – 11 April 1909, Montluçon) was a French entomologist who specialised in Coleoptera.
His collections are held by Muséum national d'histoire naturelle in Paris.

Works
1881: Quelques rectifications synonymiques touchant différents genres et espèces de Coléoptères français (1re partie). Bulletin Bimensuel de la Société entomologique de France, (1881)17(201): 150-151.
1882 Notes et remarques pour le futur catalogue des Coléoptères Gallo–Rhénane. Revue d‘Entomologie (Caen), 1, 193–207. (Pt)
1886. Recherche de l'espèce typique de quelques anciens genres. Rectifications synonymiques et notes diverses. Herbin, Montluçon. 36 pp.

References
Constantin, R. 1992: Memorial des Coléopteristes Français. Bulletin de liaison de l'Association des Coléoptéristes de la région parisienne, Paris (Suppl. 14), S. 1-92, pp. 42
Roux, C. 1911: [Gozis, M. G. P. des] Annales de la Société Linnéenne de Lyon (Nouvelle Séries), Lyon 6, pp. 147, 179

French entomologists
French genealogists
People from Montluçon
1851 births
1909 deaths